The 9×23mm Steyr, also known as 9mm Steyr, is a centerfire pistol cartridge originally developed for the Steyr M1912 pistol.

History
Adopted in 1912, the 9mm Steyr was the service ammunition for most branches of the military in Austria-Hungary during World War I and remained the service ammunition for Austria, Romania and Chile between the World Wars.  Some MP 34 submachine guns were also issued in this caliber in addition to 9×25mm Mauser. When the Austrian Army was incorporated in the Wehrmacht in 1938 following the Anschluss, many Steyr M1912 pistols and MP 34 submachine guns were rebarrelled to 9×19mm Parabellum for standardization purposes.

Design
The cartridge headspaces on the mouth of the case. Its performance is close to that of the .38 ACP.  Unrelated to the modern 9×23mm Winchester, it is similar to the 9×23mm Largo cartridge in performance, but their dimensions are just different enough to make them non-interchangeable.

Handloading

For handloading, reloadable Boxer-primed cartridge cases can be made from 5.56×45mm NATO brass.  This requires inside neck-reaming, as such a conversion would otherwise leave unacceptably thick mid-to-rear case walls from the original cartridges to form the mouths of the new, shortened cases.  At least one commercial source apparently can produce such a forming die set, complete with reamer.  Loading data would be much like .38 ACP.

Gallery

References

Pistol and rifle cartridges
Military cartridges
Weapons and ammunition introduced in 1911